Leo Valentine is a fictional character from the British Channel 4 soap opera Hollyoaks, played by Brian Bovell. Despite being on the show for over three years, Leo has not been involved in any major storylines, however does serve as a comedic character. In March 2010, it was announced that Leo was one of 16 characters to be axed from the show; he left in August 2010.

Storylines

Backstory
Leo is the estranged husband of Diane (Pauline Black), the father of Calvin (Ricky Whittle), Sonny (Devon Anderson) and Sasha (Nathalie Emmanuel). He left Diane and his children in 1993, where he returned to his mistress Valerie Holden (Samantha Giles). Years before, she had given birth to Danny (David Judge) and in 1992 she gave birth to Lauren (Dominique Jackson). In 2006, Leo discovered Diane had died and left his secret family to look after his other children. Valerie returned to Leo's life in 2007 where she introduced his children to their siblings.

2006–10
Leo arrives in Hollyoaks to look after his children after their mother's death. Leo is involved in several one-night stands with Myra McQueen (Nicole Barber-Lane). Leo is disappointed when Sonny leaves home to live with his aunt. On 6 September 2007, Leo's former mistress, Valerie, turns up with his illegitimate children Danny and Lauren. Valerie leaves her children with Leo and leaves for abroad. Calvin and Sasha are horrified to discover their father cheated on their mother and that they have two more siblings. A year later, Valerie returns and begins a short relationship with Leo until she kisses Calvin and leaves.

In 2009, after Warren Fox's (Jamie Lomas) death, his foster brother Spencer Gray (Darren John Langford) moves in with the Valentines. Leo dislikes Spencer's unruly attitude and tries to convince Calvin to put him in a care home where he can be properly looked after. Calvin eventually does so. Leo discovers that Calvin left Warren to die and is forced to kick him out due to Sasha's upset over the situation. However, things get worse when Leo then discovers that Lauren is pregnant, unaware that she had lied to Spencer in order to con him out of his inheritance. Leo threatens Lauren's boyfriend Gaz Bennett (Joel Goonan) when it appears he is the father. Lauren then admits she made up the pregnancy. Calvin is shot dead by Theresa McQueen (Jorgie Porter) on his wedding day, and Leo is devastated. To make matters worse, Lauren collapses and falls down the stairs at The Loft during an argument with Sasha about her scheme to fleece Spencer out of his inheritance. When she is admitted to hospital, it is revealed that she is suffering from a life-threatening blood clot. Valerie then returns to take her back to Spain with her. Lauren decides to move to Spain as Leo gets a job in London. Lauren then realises how much her father will miss her, so she decides to stay with him. A goodbye party is held for the Valentines, as Lauren, Valerie and Spencer all announce they are also coming to London. The Valentines then leave in August 2010.

In July 2014, Sonny (now played by Aaron Fontaine) informs his current fiancée Carmel McQueen (Gemma Merna) that Leo has provided him with a financial deposit for the two of them to purchase a household of their own in the village.

Reception
Gareth McLean of Radio Times has branded Leo as useless.

References

External links
 Leo Valentine on the E4 website

Television characters introduced in 2006
Hollyoaks characters
Fictional gamblers
Fictional Black British people
Male characters in television
Fictional people from London